Covre is an Italian surname. Notable people with the surname include:

Alessandro Covre (died 1951), Italian wrestler
Giuseppe Covre (1950–2020), Italian politician 
Tullio Covre (1917–1961), Italian flying ace

Italian-language surnames